Shah Jahan Rural District is a rural district (dehestan) in the Central District of Faruj County, North Khorasan Province, Iran. At the 2006 census, its population was 8,488, in 2,325 families.  The rural district has 11 villages.

References 

Rural Districts of North Khorasan Province
Faruj County